Golden and Silver Falls State Natural Area is a state park in Coos County, Oregon, United States, administered by the Oregon Parks and Recreation Department. The nearest settlement is Allegany.

See also
 List of Oregon state parks

References

External links
 

State parks of Oregon
Parks in Coos County, Oregon